Janette Tredrea (born 24 July 1956 in Carlton, Victoria) is an Australian former cricket player. Tredrea played five Tests and five One Day Internationals (ODI) for Australia.

Janette Tredrea is the sister of Sharon Tredrea, who played ten Tests and 31 ODIs for Australia.

References

External links
 Janette Tredrea  at CricketArchive
 Janette Tredrae at southernstars.org.au

1956 births
Australia women One Day International cricketers
Australia women Test cricketers
Living people
Victoria women cricketers